Marcin Szczygielski (born 1972) is a Polish writer, journalist and graphic designer. He is an author of theatrical plays, novels for adults and for teenagers. Since December 2012 he has been a member of Stowarzyszenie Pisarzy Polskich (Polish Writers' Association).

Biography 

Szczygielski was born in Warsaw to actor Cezary Szczygielski and singer Iwona Racz-Szczygielska, vocalist of Polish girlsband Filipinki. His parents divorced while he was still a child and he was raised by his mother.

Szczygielski is openly gay and lives in Warsaw with his partner (since 1994) Tomasz Raczek, a journalist and film critic.

Career 

His debut was PL-BOY (published 2003), a fictional, humorous account of the editorial department of the Polish Edition Playboy magazine of which Szczygielski used to be the art director. The novels that followed – Wiosna PL-BOYa (2004), Nasturcje i cwoki (2005) and Farfocle namietnosci (2006) – established him as one of the most-read authors of popular literature in Poland. Berek (2007) tells a story of a difficult friendship between an elderly lady - a conservative Catholic and her young neighbour, openly gay. The novel immediately hit the bestseller list. Its spinoff, titled Bierki, was published in 2010. In 2011 Poczet Krolowych Polskich (The Queens Saga) was published, which is claimed to be Szczygielski's most mature and most ambitious novel. This elaborate, multigenerational family saga that portrays the contemporary Polish history through the lives of women of 4 generations, was nominated for the Srebrny Kałamarz Literary Prize.

A separate part of Marcin Szczygielski's literary output are books aimed towards younger readers. Each of them has received numerous awards and recognition awards in literary contests, whereas novels Czarny Mlyn and Za niebieskimi drzwiami have been incorporated into the extracurricular reading list in Polish elementary schools.

Szczygielski's theatrical plays have been staged in many Polish theatres – among others in the cities of Warsaw, Łódź, Płock and Cracow.

Books 
Aimed towards adult readers:

 PL-BOY, novel (Instytut Wydawniczy Latarnik, 2003) 
 Wiosna PL-BOYa, novel (Instytut Wydawniczy Latarnik, 2004) 
 Kuchnia na ciezkie czasy, cookbook (Instytut Wydawniczy Latarnik, 2004) 
 Nasturcje i Cwoki, novel (Instytut Wydawniczy Latanik, 2005) 
 Farfocle namietnosci, novel (Instytut Wydawniczy Latarnik, 2006) 
 Berek / Tag, novel (Instytut Wydawniczy Latarnik, 2007) 
 Bierki, novel (Instytut Wydawniczy Latarnik, 2010) 
 Furie i inne groteski, theatrical plays (Instytut Wydawniczy Latarnik, 2011) 
 Poczet Krolowych Polskich / The Queens Saga, novel (Instytut Wydawniczy Latarnik, 2011) 
 Kallas, theatrical play (Instytut Wydawniczy Latarnik, 2011) 
 Filipinki – to my!, monograph of Filipinki, a Polish girlsband (Agora SA, 2013) 
 Sanato, novel (Instytut Wydawniczy Latarnik, 2014) 
 Bingo, novel (Instytut Wydawniczy Latarnik, 2015) 

Aimed towards young readers:

 Omega, novel (Instytut Wydawniczy Latarnik, 2009) 
 Za niebieskimi drzwiami / Behind the Blue Door / Hinter der blauen Tür, novel (Poland – Instytut Wydawniczy Latarnik, 2010  / Germany – S. Fischer Verlag GmbH, 2016 )
 Czarny Mlyn / The Black Mill, novel (Stentor, 2011) 
 Czarownica pietro nizej, novel (Bajka, 2013) 
 Arka Czasu / Ark of Time / Flügel aus Papier / Ковчег часу, novel (Poland – Stentor, 2013  / Germany – S. Fischer Verlag GmbH, 2015  / Ukraine – Urbino, 2016 )
 Tuczarnia motyli, novel (Bajka, 2014) 
 Teatr Niewidzialnych Dzieci, novel (Instytut Wydawniczy Latarnik, 2016) 
 Klątwa dziewiątych urodzin, novel (Bajka, 2016) 
 Serce Neftydy, novel (Instytut Wydawniczy Latarnik, 2017) 

Theatrical plays:

 Berek, czyli upior w moherze. Premiere: Warsaw – 2009
 Wydmuszka. Premieres: Warsaw – 2010; Plock – 2011; Lodz – 2011; Cracow – 2014; Prague – 2016
 Furie. Premiere: Warsaw – 2011
 Kallas. Premiere: Warsaw – 2012
 Single i Remiksy. Premiere: Warsaw – 2012
 Kochanie na kredyt. Premiere: London – 2013

Awards and honors 

 Omega – recognition award in Halina Skrobiszewska Children's Literature Contest and incorporation into the Museum of Children's Books Treasure List, 2010
 Omega – recognition award in the Most Beautiful Books of the Year 2009 Contest organized by the Polish Association of Book Publishers
 Czarny Mlyn – Grand Prix in the Second Astrid Lindgren Literary Contest, 2010
 Czarny Mlyn – 1st Prize in the Second Astrid Lindgren Literary Contest, category: novels for children aged 10–14, 2010
 Omega – Book of the Year 2010 in the contest organized by the Polish section of IBBY - International Board on Books for Young People, 2011
 Za niebieskimi drzwiami – Duzy Dong (previously Children's Bestseller of the Year) – 1st Prize awarded by the Professional Jury in Dong literary contest organized by the Polish section of IBBY, 2011
 Za niebieskimi drzwiami – Children's Jury recognition award in Dong literary contest (previously Children's Bestseller of the Year) organized by the Polish section of IBBY, 2011
 Za niebieskimi drzwiami – 2nd Prize in Halina Skrobiszewska Children's Literature Contest and incorporation into the Museum of Children's Books Treasure List, 2011
 Poczet Krolowych Polskich / The Queens Saga – nomination for Srebrny Kałamarz Literary Prize in the Konstanty Ildefons Gałczyński Literary Contest, 2012
 Za niebieskimi drzwiami – the novel incorporated into the international IBBY Honour List presenting the most outstanding children's books, 2012
 Arka Czasu – Grand Prix in the 3rd Astrid Lindgren Literary Contest for children's and teenager's books, 2013
 Arka Czasu – 1st Prize in the 3rd Astrid Lindgren Literary Contest, category: novels for children aged 10–14, 2013
 Czarownica pietro nizej – Book of April 2013 according to Magazyn Literacki Książki
 Arka Czasu – recognition award in the Book of the Year 2013 Literary Contest organized by the Polish section of IBBY, 2013
 Czarownica pietro nizej – Zielona Gaska 2013 Literary Prize awarded by Konstanty Ildefons Gałczyński Foundation, 2014
 Arka Czasu – 1st Prize in Halina Skrobiszewska Children's Literature Contest and incorporation into the Museum of Children's Books Treasure List, 2014
 Guliwer w Krainie Olbrzymów (Gulliver in the Land of Giants) 2014 Literary Prize for significant and lasting contributions to children's literature awarded by a Polish magazine about children's literature Guliwer, 2014
 Flügel aus Papier (German edition of Arka Czasu) – chosen one of the best seven books for young adults in Germany in April 2015 by Deutschlandfunk, 2015
 Flügel aus Papier – Book of July 2015 by Deutsche Akademie für Kinder- und Jugendliteratur, 2015
 Tuczarnia motyli – 1st Prize in Halina Skrobiszewska Children's Literature Contest and incorporation into the Museum of Children's Books Treasure List, 2015
 Flügel aus Papier – Kinderbuchpreis 2015, Children's Book of the Year in Austria by Jury der Jungen Leser, 2015
 Teatr Niewidzialnych Dzieci –  1st Prize in the 4th Astrid Lindgren Literary Contest, category: novels for children aged 10–14, 2016
 Teatr Niewidzialnych Dzieci – recognition award in the Book of the Year 2016 Literary Contest organized by the Polish section of IBBY, 2016.
 Klatwa dziewiatych urodzin – Book of the Year 2016 in the contest organized by the Polish section of IBBY, 2016.
 Klatwa dziewiatych urodzin – Book of December 2016 according to Magazyn Literacki Książki, 2016.
 Bronze Medal for Merit to Culture – Gloria Artis for distinguished contributions to the Polish culture and national heritage
 Klatwa dziewiatych urodzin – Warsaw Literary Prize, 2017.

Notes 

1972 births
Living people
Writers from Warsaw
Polish children's writers
21st-century Polish novelists
Polish male novelists
Polish LGBT novelists
Gay novelists
21st-century Polish male writers